81 Squadron or 81st Squadron may refer to:

 81st Fighter Squadron, a unit of the United States Air Force 
 VFA-81 (Fighter Attack Squadron 81), a unit of the United States Navy

See also
 81st Division (disambiguation)
 81st Brigade (disambiguation)
 81st Regiment (disambiguation)